Hufayr al-Tahta (also spelled Hafir Tahta) is a Syrian village located in the Douma District of Rif Dimashq. Hufayr al-Tahta had a population of 3,688 as per the 2004 census.

References

Populated places in Douma District